Denivys Will da Vitória Júnior (born 1 May 2001), simply known as Denivys, is a Brazilian footballer who plays as a goalkeeper for Cruzeiro.

Club career
Born in Vitória, Espírito Santo, Denivys joined Cruzeiro's youth setup in 2015, from hometown side . He started to train with the main squad in January 2020, after the departure of Rafael.

On 18 May 2021, Denivys renewed his contract until December 2023. On 26 January 2022, after longtime incumbent Fábio left the club and new signing Rafael Cabral was not registered in time, he made his first team debut by starting in a 3–0 Campeonato Mineiro home win over URT.

Career statistics

References

External links
Cruzeiro profile 

2001 births
Living people
People from Vitória, Espírito Santo
Brazilian footballers
Association football goalkeepers
Cruzeiro Esporte Clube players
Sportspeople from Espírito Santo